The Model Boy (German: Der Musterknabe) is a 1963 Austrian comedy film directed by Werner Jacobs and starring Peter Alexander, Cornelia Froboess and Gunther Philipp.  A doctor poses as his brother and goes to school to help him get through the final exam of high school. In high school, he falls in love with a female student.

It was shot at the Rosenhügel Studios in Vienna. The film's sets were designed by the art directors Fritz Jüptner-Jonstorff and Alexander Sawczynski.

Cast
Peter Alexander as Doctor Fritz Geyer
Cornelia Froboess as Renate Pacher
Theo Lingen as Prof. Dr. Liebreich
Gunther Philipp as Doctor Erwin Berthold
Gusti Wolf as Miss Puppernick, secretary
Wolfgang Jansen as Benno Geyer
Rudolf Carl as Erich Pacher
Elisabeth Epp as Mathilde Pacher
Adrienne Gessner as Elisabeth Geyer
Joseph Egger as porter
 Franz Stoß as Professor Kramm
Otto Loewe as Doctor Oberwasser

References

Bibliography 
 Von Dassanowsky, Robert. Austrian Cinema: A History. McFarland, 2005.

External links
 

1963 films
1963 comedy films
Austrian comedy films
Films about educators
Films set in schools
Films directed by Werner Jacobs
1960s German-language films
Films shot at Rosenhügel Studios
Constantin Film films